Pics.io (pronounced "pixy-o") is a digital asset management app developed by TopTechPhoto. It aims to improve work with images/videos/graphics using Google Drive and Amazon S3 as storage through a centralized library with advanced search options such as keywords and custom metadata fields.

For example, it can be used to demosaic a DNG image in a web browser.

TopTechPhoto is founded by Yevgeniy Shpika, Konstantin Shtondenko and Vlad Tsepelev who have backgrounds in medical imaging and software development.

File viewing 
The web client allows to view the following file formats:
 Image files (.JPEG, .PNG, .GIF, .TIFF, .BMP)
 Video files (WebM, .MPEG4, .3GPP, .MOV, .AVI, .MPEGPS, .WMV, .FLV, .OGG)
 Audio formats (MP3, MPEG, WAV, .ogg)
 Adobe Portable Document Format (.PDF)
 Adobe Illustrator (.AI)
 Adobe Photoshop (.PSD)
 Scalable Vector Graphics (.SVG)
 PostScript (.EPS, .PS)
 Fonts (.TTF)
 Raw Image formats

References

External links

Photo software
Image organizers
Raster graphics editors